A Voyage Round My Father is an autobiographical play by John Mortimer, later adapted for television.

The first version of the play appeared as a series of three half-hour sketches for BBC radio in 1963. It then became a television play with Ian Richardson playing Mortimer, Tim Good the young Mortimer, and Mark Dignam his blind barrister father. Mortimer then adapted it for the stage, and it appeared at the Haymarket Theatre in 1971 with Alec Guinness as the father and Jeremy Brett as the son. Mortimer later (1982) turned the play back into a film for television (produced by Thames Television for ITV) in which Laurence Olivier played the father, Alan Bates the son, Elizabeth Sellars the mother and Jane Asher Elizabeth. This production was notable for including blind actor Esmond Knight in a sighted role, as a judge whom Mortimer senior faces. It was filmed in Mortimer's own house.

The title is an echo of Xavier de Maistre's fantasy Voyage autour de ma chambre, or in English, Voyage Around My Room (written 1790, published 1794). 

In June 2006, the play was revived at the Donmar Warehouse with Derek Jacobi and Dominic Rowan; it transferred to Wyndham's Theatre in September.

References

External links

1963 plays
English plays
Works by John Mortimer
International Emmy Award for Drama winners